The Midshipmaid is a 1931 British comedy play by Ian Hay and Stephen King-Hall, which ran for 227 performances at the Shaftesbury Theatre in London's West End. The following year Hay wrote a novel based on the play.

Original cast
Able Seaman Pook -	A.W. Baskcomb
Bandmaster Tappett	- Roger Maxwell
Celia Newbiggin -	Jane Baxter
Commander ffosbery	- Basil Foster
Cora Golightly	- Marjorie Playfair
Corporal of Marines/Leading Torpedoman Huggins	- Henry Thompson
Dora Golightly	- Kathleen Kelly
Guest - Nancy Russell
Instructor Lt. Commander Tomkinson	- Peter Mather
Lady Mildred Martyn - Mary Clare
Lord Chinley -	Terence Downing
Lt. Commander Valentine - Charlton Morton
Lt. Kingsford - Edward Harben
Lucy -	Ivy des Voeux
Major Spink - Michael Shepley
Marine Bundy - S. Victor Stanley
Marine Robbins	- D.J. Williams
Marine Smith - Albert Arlen
Midshipman Golightly - Humphrey Morton
Sick Bay Attendant Slingsby/Leading Stoker Hammond	- Oliver Gordon
Sir Percy Newbiggin -	Clive Currie

Film adaptation
In 1932 it was made into a film of the same title by Gainsborough Pictures, starring Jessie Matthews and Basil Sydney.

References

Bibliography
 Goble, Alan. The Complete Index to Literary Sources in Film. Walter de Gruyter, 1999.
 Wearing, J.P. The London Stage 1930-1939: A Calendar of Productions, Performers, and Personnel.  Rowman & Littlefield, 2014.

1931 plays
Plays by Ian Hay
Plays by Stephen King-Hall
British plays adapted into films
Comedy plays
West End plays